Luburić, sometimes transcribed Luburic or Luburich, is a South Slavic surname that originated in Herzegovina. It is borne by both Croats and Serbs.

Melissa Bean née Luburić, former U.S. Representative
Nada Luburić, sister of Vjekoslav, guard at Stara Gradiška
Stevan Luburić (fl. 1924–1930), Yugoslav footballer, SK Jugoslavija
Vjekoslav Luburić (1914–1969), World War II Ustaše official

References

Croatian surnames
Serbian surnames